The Third Day is a 1965 suspense thriller film directed by Jack Smight and starring George Peppard and Elizabeth Ashley. It was based on a novel by Joseph Hayes.

Plot
Steve Mallory has been involved in a car crash, and it appears he has killed his mistress, Holly Mitchell. Steve suffers from amnesia, he has no recollection whatever of the event. His wife is hostile and cold toward him, his father-in-law has been severely disabled by a stroke and his wife's cousin appears to despise him. Added to this is the sinister presence of Lester Aldrich, who turns out to be the downtrodden husband of the sleazy nymphomaniac Holly.

Cast
 George Peppard as Steve Mallory 
 Elizabeth Ashley as Alexandria Mallory 
 Roddy McDowall as Oliver Parsons 
 Arthur O'Connell as Dr. Wheeler 
 Mona Washbourne as Catherine Parsons 
 Herbert Marshall as Austin Parsons 
 Robert Webber as Dom Guardiano 
 Charles Drake as Lawrence Conway 
 Sally Kellerman as Holly Mitchell 
 Arte Johnson as Lester Aldrich
 Vincent Gardenia as Preston

Production
Jack L. Warner was reluctant to make a film about amnesia, but he agreed to finance this one, because he had an expensive deal with George Peppard, who wanted to do the movie. Warner offered the film to Jack Smight in part because I'd Rather Be Rich, Smight's first feature, had been made relatively cheaply and because star George Peppard had worked with Smight before on television. Smight said it was "not a great script by any means, but one with a lot of twists and turns. It dealt with the amnesia of the lead character, which Peppard played. The other characters were quite well written and I felt it had possibilities. Knowing that Peppard was set made me feel that I could make a decent film out of it."

Exterior scenes were filmed along the Russian River, north of the town of Bodega Bay in northern California. Film sites include the Highway 1 bridge crossing the Russian River near the junction with highway 116 and Goat Rock State Beach.

Smight delivered the movie on time and on budget.

Reception
According to Smight, "the film did decent business, and to this day the residual payments from TV keep rolling in, for which I’m eternally grateful. Jack Warner was pleased enough to sign me to an added four-picture deal."

External links
 IMDB entry

References

1965 films
1960s psychological thriller films
American psychological thriller films
Films about amnesia
Films based on American novels
Films directed by Jack Smight
Warner Bros. films
1960s English-language films
1960s American films